Dora Hitz (30 March 1856, Altdorf bei Nürnberg - 20 November 1924, Berlin) was a Court Painter to the Romanian Royal Family, a member of the November Group and co-founder of the Berlin Secession.

Life 
When she was six years old, her family moved to Ansbach and at thirteen she was sent to Munich to study at the "Damenmalschule der Frau Staatsrat Weber", an art school for young women, where she studied with Wilhelm von Lindenschmit the Younger. At the Art and Industrial Exhibition of 1876, she met and became acquainted with Elisabeth of Wied, the Queen consort of Romania (perhaps better known under her literary name "Carmen Sylva"). As a result, Hitz was appointed as the Court Painter. In addition to oil paintings and book illustrations, she also created fresco murals in the Music Hall of Peleș Castle in Sinaia.

After 1880, she lived in Paris, where she studied with Luc-Olivier Merson, Gustave Courtois, Jean-Joseph Benjamin-Constant and Eugène Carrière, who had the most influence on her style. She spent 1886/87 in Romania, then returned to Paris, becoming friends with Eugen Jettel and Hermann Bahr. She travelled throughout Brittany and Normandy and, in 1890, became a member of the  Salon of the Société des Artistes Français. From 1892, she was a regular participant in the exhibitions of the Société Nationale des Beaux Arts.

Although she had been and would continue to be successful in Paris, she moved to Berlin in 1892 and joined the "Vereins Berliner Künstlerinnen und Kunstfreundinnen" (an association of female artists) that gave her access to many upper middle-class clients who commissioned portraits. She founded a women's art school in 1894, operated a studio and struck up a friendship with Käthe Kollwitz. Hitz exhibited her work at the Woman's Building at the 1893 World's Columbian Exposition in Chicago, Illinois. In 1898, she was one of the founding members of the Berlin Secession. She was awarded the Villa Romana Prize in 1906, which included a stipendium that enabled her to spend a year in Florence.

During World War I she began to experience financial difficulties, fell ill, and gradually became a recluse.

Selected paintings

References

Further reading 
 Dora Hitz. In: Thieme-Becker, Allgemeines Lexikon der Bildenden Künstler von der Antike bis zur Gegenwart. Vol.XVII, E. A. Seemann, Leipzig 1924, pg.153.
 Dora Hitz. In: Hans Vollmer, Allgemeines Lexikon der bildenden Künstler des XX. Jahrhunderts. Vol.VI. E. A. Seemann, Leipzig 1962, pg.61
 Margrit Bröhan: Dora Hitz (1856–1924). In: Britta Jürgs, Da ist nichts mehr, wie es die Natur gewollt. Porträts von Künstlerinnen und Schriftstellerinnen um 1900. AvivA, Berlin 2001, pgs.180–192.

External links 

 ArtNet: More paintings by Hitz
 Dora Hitz in The Studio, Vol.11   @ Google Books

1856 births
1924 deaths
Impressionism
German women painters
German expatriates in Romania
19th-century German painters
20th-century German painters
19th-century German women artists
20th-century German women artists
People from Altdorf bei Nürnberg